Blantyre United Football Club was a Malawian football (soccer) club based in Blantyre founded in 2008 and dissolved in 2018.

History
The club was founded in 2008 as a reserve side for Escom United. 

In 2010, after won Southern Regional Football League and promoted to TNM Super League, was renamed Blantyre United.

In the 2012–13 season, the Blantyre-based side finished 3rd, their best ever performance, but in the next season struggled to avoid relegation finishing 12th and relegated at the end of the 2014 season.

After two seasons in the Second Division, Blantyre United returned to Super League of Malawi, winning the Southern Region Football League in 2016 season, but relegated again after ranking 15th at the end of the 2017 season.

In 2018 Blantyre United was disbanded for lack of funds.

Stadium
The team was played at the 50,000 capacity Kamuzu Stadium.

Honours
Southern Region Football League
Winners (3): 2007, 2009–10, 2016
Runners-up (1): 2008

References

External links
 
 
Tag archives - Nyasatimes.com

Defunct football clubs in Malawi
Football clubs in Malawi
Works association football clubs in Malawi